Cowpen  is an area of Blyth and former civil parish, now in the parish of Blyth in the county of Northumberland, England. It is just east of the A189 road. The Ward population taken at the 2011 census was 4,466. In 1911 the parish had a population of 21,295.

In the 12th century CE, its name was Cupum, possibly the dative plural of Old Norse kupa, "a cuplike depression or valley".

Governance 
Cowpen was formerly a township in Horton parish, from 1866 Cowpen was a civil parish in its own right until it was abolished on 1 April 1920 to form Blyth.

References

Villages in Northumberland
Former civil parishes in Northumberland
Blyth, Northumberland